The Other Final is a 2003 documentary film, directed by  of Dutch communications agency KesselsKramer, about a football match between Bhutan and Montserrat, then the two lowest-ranked teams in the FIFA World Rankings. The game was played in the Changlimithang Stadium, Thimphu, Bhutan on the same day as the 2002 FIFA World Cup Final.  Bhutan won the game 4–0, their first ever victory and also the first time they had kept a clean sheet in any match. The friendly match, officially sanctioned by FIFA, saw Bhutan rise out of the bottom two of the world rankings and kept Montserrat in last place. The referee was Englishman, Steve Bennett.

Background

In 2002, Montserrat were ranked last in the world FIFA rankings, with Bhutan ranked second to last. Prior to their meeting, Bhutan, who first competed in 1982, had never won an official match (although they had one single victory over Tibet, who are not FIFA members so the match was not officially sanctioned), whilst Montserrat, who made their debut in 1950, had only managed two victories, both against Anguilla in the 1995 Caribbean Cup, in their entire history. Additionally, financial constraints and a slump in the popularity of the game in the 1980s and 1990s had impacted the development of the national team in Bhutan, and the low level of facilities in the country had prevented the team from even attempting to qualify for the FIFA World Cup.

Montserrat had also suffered their own very significant misfortune when the Soufrière Hills volcano erupted, causing widespread devastation to the island. Seismic activity had occurred in 1897–1898, 1933–1937, and again in 1966–1967, but the eruption that began on 18 July 1995 was the first in Montserrat since the 16th century. When pyroclastic flows and mudflows began occurring regularly, the national capital, Plymouth, was evacuated, and a week later a pyroclastic flow buried the city under several metres of debris. The British navy ship  took a large role in evacuating Montserrat's population to other islands; these included Antigua and Barbuda, who warned they would not be able to cope with many more refugees. About 7,000 people, or two thirds of the whole population, fled Montserrat; 4,000 of them to the United Kingdom. These catastrophic events understandably had a major impact on football in Montserrat and the team did not compete at all for four years. When they returned they had to play all of their matches away from Montserrat after the eruptions had not merely destroyed the only football stadium of an international standard, but rendered half the entire island uninhabitable.

At the same time, with the Netherlands having failed to qualify for the 2002 FIFA World Cup, two Dutch ad-agency partners, Johan Kramer and Matthijs de Jongh, not having their home team to cheer on, pondered who the worst national team in the world might be. (De Jongh: "That's the official version, but the real story behind it is that I had been in Bhutan in 2000 and 2001, and I was fascinated by the country and wanted to share it.") With Bhutan and Montserrat so close to each other at the bottom of the FIFA rankings, they set out to arrange a match between the two nations. The match was not as easily arranged as might be imagined. Firstly, this match was being arranged by private individuals rather than by the relevant football federations during a normal international fixture window. Both sides thought that the idea was unrealistic in the beginning, and officials from both federations thought the initial suggestion of the match was merely a joke and had little knowledge of each other's countries. Kramer said that he thought Montserrat were willing to agree to the friendly and to travel all the way to Bhutan because their government felt that the publicity from the match would at least counterbalance the depressing reports about the recent serious volcanic eruptions on the island.

Three weeks prior to the match, Dutch coach Arie Schans flew out to Bhutan to take temporary charge of the side and conducted four-hour long daily training sessions with the team in order to prepare them for the match. There was a considerable deal of anticipation in Thimphu prior to the game, though the Bhutan Football Federation sought to play down the importance of victory, saying it was more important to focus on participation than winning. However, both sets of players were very much focused on getting a result; veteran Bhutan striker Dinesh Chhetri said that Bhutan would win by at least two goals to nil, whereas Montserrat midfielder Antoine Lake-Willix thought his team would win comfortably 3–0.

Match report

The game started strongly for Montserrat, who attacked quickly; and Bhutan struggled during early exchanges. However, initial nerves were settled after only five minutes when Wangay Dorji headed a goal to give Bhutan an early lead. Encouraged, this gave Bhutan the momentum to press on, but their finishing was lax and they were unable to convert the few chances they created. Montserrat were able to keep Bhutan at bay for the rest of the half and the game remained at 1–0 until well past the hour mark when referee, Steve Bennett awarded Bhutan a freekick. Dorji stepped up and scored his second of the game. The momentum remained with Bhutan and veteran forward Dinesh Chhetri scored a third, before Dorji took full advantage of a rapidly tiring Montserrat team to complete his hat trick and seal a decisive 4–0 victory, Bhutan's first victory on the international stage against any opposition, indeed, their first ever positive result of any kind, and the first time they had ever kept a clean sheet. A crowd of 15,000 watched the game, which followed an hour-long dance program designed to showcase the Buddhist traditions of the country.

Awards
The Other Final claimed two awards:
 Avignon Film Festival's best documentary (2003)
 Bermuda International Film Festival – Documentary Prize – Special Mention (2003)

Still photography and photobook
In association with KesselsKramer, the Dutch photographer  photographed the run-up in Bhutan to the match, and the match itself. The photographs were collected into a photobook, Bhutan–Montserrat: The Other Final.

Notes

References

External links

2003 documentary films
2002 in Caribbean football
2003 films
International association football matches
Documentary films about association football
Dutch documentary films
Dutch sports films
Films set in Bhutan
Films shot in Bhutan
Montserrat national football team matches
Bhutan national football team matches
2002 in Bhutanese football
June 2002 sports events in Asia